Jang Gyeong-mu (born 4 December 1944) is a South Korean wrestler. He competed in the men's freestyle 57 kg at the 1968 Summer Olympics.

References

External links
 

1944 births
Living people
South Korean male sport wrestlers
Olympic wrestlers of South Korea
Wrestlers at the 1968 Summer Olympics
Wrestlers at the 1966 Asian Games
Asian Games medalists in wrestling
Medalists at the 1966 Asian Games
Asian Games bronze medalists for South Korea
20th-century South Korean people
21st-century South Korean people